John Bacchus Dykes  (10 March 1823 – 22 January 1876) was an English clergyman and hymnwriter.

Biography

John Bacchus Dykes was born in Hull, England, the fifth child and third son of William Hey Dykes, a ship builder, later banker, and Elizabeth, daughter of Bacchus Huntington, a surgeon of Sculcoates, Yorkshire, and granddaughter of the Rev. William Huntington, Vicar of Kirk Ella. His paternal grandparents were the Rev. Thomas Dykes, LL.B., and Mary, daughter of William Hey. He was also a cousin of the Rev. George Huntington. Dykes was a younger brother of the poet and hymnwriter Eliza Alderson, and wrote tunes for at least four of her hymns.

By the age of 10, he was de facto assistant organist – there is no record of any formal appointment – at St John's Church in Myton, Hull, where his paternal grandfather (who had built the church) was vicar and his uncle (also Thomas) was organist. He also played the violin and the piano. Studying first at Kingston College, Hull, and then at the West Riding Proprietary School at Wakefield, he matriculated, as the second 'Dykes Scholar' (the second beneficiary after his elder brother, Thomas, of an endowment established in 1840 in honour of his grandfather) at Katharine Hall (now St. Catharine's College), Cambridge. There, as an extra-curricular subject, he studied music under Thomas Attwood Walmisley, whose madrigal society he joined. He also joined the Peterhouse Musical Society (later renamed the Cambridge University Musical Society), becoming its fourth President, immediately following his friend, William Thomson. Although we know, from his diaries and correspondence, from Fowler, and from reports in the Press, that a number of his part-songs were performed by the CUMS, these are currently lost. Having graduated in 1847 as a Senior Optime, he was appointed to the curacy of Malton, North Yorkshire, in 1847. He was ordained Deacon at York Minster in January 1848. The following year he was appointed a minor canon of Durham Cathedral (an appointment which he held until his death), and shortly thereafter to the office of precentor. Between 1850 and 1852 he lived at Hollingside House, now the official residence of the Vice Chancellor of the University of Durham. In 1862 he relinquished the precentorship (to the dismay of Sir Frederick Ouseley) on his appointment to the living of St. Oswald's, Durham, situated almost in the shadow of the Cathedral, where he remained until his death in 1876.

Although his paternal grandfather and his father had been firmly of an evangelical persuasion, Dykes migrated to the Anglo-Catholic, ritualist, wing of the Church of England during his Cambridge years. Although never a member of the Cambridge Camden Society, his later life showed him to be clearly in sympathy with its central tenets, as he was with those of the Oxford Movement. He was a member of the Society of the Holy Cross. At this time, antagonism between the evangelical and Anglo-Catholic wings of the Church of England was heated and sometimes violent. The seminal case concerned the Brighton-based Rev. John Purchas (1823–72) who, as a consequence of a Privy Council judgment which bore his name, was compelled to desist from such practices as facing east during the celebration of Holy Communion, using wafer bread, and wearing vestments other than cassock and surplice. Another clergyman, the London-based Alexander Mackonochie (whose worship style Lord Shaftesbury had characterised as being "in outward form and ritual…the worship of Jupiter or Juno") was pursued through the courts until the pressure proved too much and he resigned his living in 1882. Although Dykes's treatment at the hands of the evangelical party, which included his own Bishop, Charles Baring, was largely played out locally, Baring's refusal to license a curate to help the overworked Dykes in his ever-expanding parish, led the latter to seek from the Court of Queen's Bench a writ of mandamus, requiring the Bishop to do so. Against the expectations of many senior legal figures, including the Attorney-General, Dr. A. J. Stephens, Q.C., whose services Dykes had retained, the Court, led by puisne judge Sir Colin Blackburn, Q.C., refused to interfere in what they saw to be a matter of the Bishop's sole discretion. Dykes's defeat was followed by a gradual deterioration in his physical and mental health, necessitating absence (which was to prove permanent) from St. Oswald's from March 1875. Rest and the bracing Swiss air proving unavailing, Dykes eventually went to recover on the south coast of England where, on 22 January 1876, he died aged 52. However, Fowler's assertion that he died at St. Leonard's on Sea is false: he died in the asylum at Ticehurst, some 18 miles distant. More significantly, his assertion that Dykes's ill-health was a consequence of overwork, exacerbated by his clash with Bishop Baring, has recently been questioned; one scholar suggests that the medical evidence points to his having succumbed to tertiary syphilis, and speculates that Dykes may have contracted the disease during his undergraduate years. He is buried in the ‘overflow’ churchyard of St. Oswald's, a piece of land for whose acquisition and consecration he had been responsible a few years earlier. Touchingly, he shares a grave with his youngest daughter, Mabel, who died, aged 10, of scarlet fever in 1870. Dykes's grave is now the only marked grave in what, in recent years, has been transformed into a children's playground.

Works and influence
Dykes published numerous sermons, book reviews and articles on theology and church music, many of them in the Ecclesiastic and Theologian. These display considerable erudition and wit (not to mention a penchant for damnation by faint praise and a fondness for litotes and gentle sarcasm), especially on the topics of the Apocalypse, the Psalms, Biblical numerology and, unsurprisingly, the function of music and ritual in church services.  However, he is best known for over 300 hymn tunes he composed. Although Dykes reveals that he composed a number of tunes specially for use in Durham Cathedral's Galilee Chapel, the first of his tunes to have been published appeared in The Hon. and Rev. John Grey's Manual of Psalm and Hymn Tunes (Cleaver: London, 1857). But this was essentially a hymnal with a local circulation and would have done little to establish Dykes as a composer. Of far greater significance was his speculative submission in 1860 of six tunes to the music editor (W.H. Monk) of a new venture: Hymns Ancient and Modern.  The six were: his first (of three) tunes entitled DIES IRAE (set to the words Day of wrath O day of mourning, now almost certainly never sung); HOLLINGSIDE (Jesu, lover of my soul); HORBURY (Nearer, my God, to Thee); MELITA, (Eternal Father, strong to save, used at the funerals of J F Kennedy, Sir Winston Churchill, and the Duke of Edinburgh); NICAEA (Holy, holy, holy! Lord God Almighty!, a tune which bears striking similarities to John Hopkins’ TRINITY, set in 1850 to the same words ); ST. CROSS (O come and mourn with me awhile); and ST. CUTHBERT (Our blest Redeemer, ere He breathed).  He also submitted a harmonisation of the tune STOCKTON. Other, later, tunes which achieved acclaim include GERONTIUS (Praise to the Holiest in the height, taken from Cardinal Newman's poem The Dream of Gerontius, and sung at the funeral of William Gladstone ); LUX BENIGNA (set to Newman's poem Lead, Kindly Light); STRENGTH AND STAY (O strength and stay, upholding all creation. The author of the hymn O perfect love, all human thoughts transcending was inspired to write it by Dykes's tune; and DOMINUS REGIT ME (The King of Love my shepherd is, the words written by his friend and editor of the first two editions of Hymns Ancient & Modern, the Rev. Sir Henry Williams Baker Bt.). His many harmonisations include WIR PFLÜGEN (We plough the fields, and scatter), MILES LANE (All hail the power of Jesu’s name) and O QUANTA QUALIA (O, what their joy and their glory must be). He also wrote two major anthems — These are they that came out of great tribulation and The Lord is my shepherd — numerous small scale anthems and motets; Communion, Morning and Evening Services; and a setting of the words of the Burial Service. These have all fallen into disuse in recent years, some deservedly so, although the large scale anthems display a fair imitation of Mendelssohnian counterpoint and pre-echoes of Edwardian grandeur, and the Burial Service is a minor gem. He also wrote a single piece — Andantino — for organ solo.

Whereas the proliferation of Dykes's tunes in hymnals published throughout the nineteenth century, together with some surviving correspondence by hymnal compilers and by clergymen, in the UK and overseas (including the US and Nyasaland (now Malawi)), show that his compositions were highly regarded, the end of his century brought a widespread reaction against much of the Victorian aesthetic, and Dykes's music did not escape a censure which was often vituperative. In particular, his music was condemned for its alleged over-chromaticism (even though some 92% of his hymn tunes are either entirely, or almost entirely diatonic)  and for its imputed sentimentality. (Speaking of Victorian hymn-tunes generally, but evidently with Dykes in his sights  Vaughan Williams wrote of ‘the miasma of the languishing and sentimental hymn tunes which so often disfigure our services’ )  Whereas it is indeed reasonable to characterise his music as often being sentimental, his critics never paused to explain why nineteenth century church services, which were replete with sentimental imagery, prose and choreography, should not be accompanied by music of a like kind. Nor did they explain why sentimentality per se is a bad thing, nor why music invariably improves in inverse proportion to its sentimental content. As one writer put it, in a wider consideration of the subject: “Something is wrong with sentimentality: the only question is, What is it?”  As for Dykes's harmonies generally (of which the twentieth century writers Erik Routley and Kenneth Long were outspoken in their disparagement), scholars in recent years have questioned the twentieth century orthodoxy which condemned Dykes's music out of hand, with Professors Arthur Hutchings, Nicholas Temperley and (especially) Jeremy Dibble seeing the importance of Dykes's pioneering work in moving hymn-tunes from the bland and four-square long metre tunes which had been the staple of Tate and Brady's New Version of the Psalms. “A…characteristic element of [Dykes’s] style is his use of imaginative diatonic and chromatic harmony. Dykes was thoroughly aware of the rich reservoir of continental harmonic innovation in the music of Schubert, Mendelssohn, Weber, Spohr, Schumann, Chopin, Liszt and early Wagner and he had absolutely no compunction in using this developed harmonic vocabulary in his tunes both as a colourful expressive tool and as a further means of musical integration.”. (When, in 1904, the Proprietors of Hymns Ancient & Modern sought to cleanse Dykes's tunes of their chromatic excesses, one of their excisions was the harmony in the first three bars of PAX DEI, which were lifted from Mendelssohn's ‘Sonntagsmorgen’ (Op. 77 No. 1)).

Whereas evolving tastes in music have seen an inexorable decline in the use of Victorian hymn tunes generally, including those by Sir Arthur Sullivan, Sir John Stainer, Sir Joseph Barnby and Lowell Mason, some of Dykes's tunes have proved remarkably resilient, with NICAEA, MELITA, DOMINUS REGIT ME and GERONTIUS continuing to find a place in twenty-first century hymnals.

In 2017 a plaque commemorating Dykes was installed in the antechapel of St. Catharine's College, Cambridge, where he had been an undergraduate in the 1840s.

Family
On 25 July 1850, Dykes married Susannah (1827–1902), daughter of George Kingston, by whom he had three sons and five daughters:
 Ernest Huntington (“Erny”) Dykes (14 August 1851 – 11 October 1924),
 Mary Evelyn Dykes (5 October 1852 – 1921),
 Gertrude Kingston (“Gertie”) Dykes (1854 – 16 December 1942),
 Caroline Sybil (“Carrie”) Dykes (25 February 1856 – 6 April 1943),
 George Lionel Andrew Dykes, 1 November 1857 – February 1858),
 Ethel Susan Dykes (1859 – 21 March 1936),
 Mabel Hey (“Mab”) Dykes (14 May 1860 – 1 September 1870), and
 John Arthur St. Oswald Dykes (27 October 1863 – 31 January 1948).

References

Oxford Dictionary of National Biography

External links 
 Biography at the Cyber Hymnal
 
 
 
 Free scores at the Mutopia Project

1823 births
1876 deaths
Musicians from Kingston upon Hull
English hymnwriters
Alumni of St Catharine's College, Cambridge
19th-century English Anglican priests
People from Kingston upon Hull
19th-century English musicians
19th-century hymnwriters
Church of England hymnwriters